The following is a list of the 138 stations in the Metrovalencia hybrid metro/tram system in Valencia, Spain. A  portion of this network, serving a total of 35 stations, is underground. The remaining  of route, serving 103 stations, is at-grade.

Legend

Boldface: Terminus station

 Italics: Request-stop station

List

References

External links 

 Metrovalencia – official site
 Ferrocarrils de la Generalitat Valenciana (FGV)
 Metrovalencia at UrbanRail.net

 
Valencia
Valencia